Dinhata High School is a high school in the Dinhata subdivision of the Cooch Behar District in the state of West Bengal, India. Currently classes V to XII are taught in this school.

Gallery

High schools and secondary schools in West Bengal
Schools in Cooch Behar district
Educational institutions in India with year of establishment missing